= Contractual right =

Contractual right may refer to:

- a concession (contract)
- any of the rights assigned to a contracting party by a contract
